Diniyar Rinatovich Bilyaletdinov (born 27 February 1985) is a Russian former footballer.

He began his career at Lokomotiv Moscow, where he made 185 appearances and scored 38 goals across six seasons, winning four major honours. In August 2009 he was signed by Everton of the Premier League for a reported £9 million fee. He returned to Russia in January 2012 when he signed for Spartak Moscow, who loaned him out several times.

Bilyaletdinov played for Russia from 2005 to 2012, earning 46 caps and scoring 6 goals. He was part of their team which reached the semi-finals at Euro 2008.

Club career

Lokomotiv Moscow
A native of Moscow, Bilyaletdinov began his career in the Lokomotiv Moscow youth teams. After making his debut in 2004 at age of 19, he became a first team regular. In his first season the club won the Russian Premier League and was named the league's Young Player of the Year. He was the Lokomotiv captain for the 2007 season.

Everton

Bilyaletdinov signed a four-year contract with English club Everton in August 2009 for an undisclosed fee – believed to be £9 million – upon recommendation from national team manager Guus Hiddink, who was at Chelsea at that time. The move made him Everton's third most expensive signing in their history.

He made his debut for Everton coming on as an 89th-minute substitute in a 2–1 win over Wigan Athletic later in the month. On 17 October 2009, Bilyaletdinov scored his first goal for the club in a 1–1 draw against Wolverhampton Wanderers and scored again on the following week in a 1–1 draw against Aston Villa, but received his first red card in the Premier League later on in the match.

He contributed two assists in his first-ever start for Everton in the inaugural UEFA Europa League in a 4–0 win over AEK Athens, and scored against them again in the last group stage game. Bilyaletdinov scored seven goals in his first season in England, including one against Manchester United that was voted the club's goal of the season. On the final day of the 2009–10 which is 9 May 2010, he scored another brilliant goal in Everton's 1–0 win over Portsmouth which was arguably better than the goal of the season he scored.

The following season, Bilyaletdinov began to find himself on the bench, but in the second half of the season, he made more appearances following the departure of Steven Pienaar to Tottenham Hotspur. Bilyaletdinov scored his first goal of the 2010-11 Premier League season coming on as a substitute against West Ham United which was arguably even better than the other two we were on about. He scored his second against Wolverhampton Wanderers. In the final game of the 2010–11 season, on 14 May, Bilyaletdinov received another red card in a 1–0 loss against West Brom. After the game, the club decided not to appeal his sending off, so he served a three-match ban ahead of the new season.

However, despite scoring 9 goals in 77 appearances, he failed to make a major impact during his time at Everton and had been on the fringes of the first team squad during the 2011–12 season after finding himself playing in the reserves. In November 2011, Bilyaletdinov said that he sought to leave the club if he did not get a first team place, as he feared losing his place in the national team. Bilyaletdinov made his last appearance for Everton in a 1–1 draw against Aston Villa on 14 January 2012. After leaving Everton, Bilyaletdinov spoke out by criticising their tactics and lack of creativity with a problem of scoring.

Spartak Moscow
In January 2012, Bilyaletdinov was sold to Spartak Moscow for an undisclosed fee, as Everton wished to raise funds to buy other players. After his move to Spartak Moscow, Bilyaletdinov was given the number 25 shirt.

Bilyaletdinov made his debut for Spartak Moscow in a 1–1 draw against Rubin Kazan on 5 March 2012. On 6 May 2012, Bilyaletdinov scored his first goal in over three years since leaving the country and first for the club in a 3–2 win over Zenit Saint Petersburg.

In January 2014, Bilyaletdinov was loaned to fellow league team Anzhi Makhachkala.

On 23 July 2015, Bilyaletdinov's contract with Spartak was terminated by mutual consent.

Trakai
On 19 September 2017, he signed with the Lithuanian club FK Trakai. After the 2018 season he left the club.

International career

After Russia failed to qualify for the 2006 FIFA World Cup, he and several younger players were recalled to the U-21 squad for the 2006 UEFA U21 championship playoffs against Denmark but lost out to the Danes.

Bilyaletdinov played in ten out of twelve UEFA Euro 2008 qualifiers. He scored the equalising goal against Israel, but the team lost in final minutes, 1–2. In the following match against Andorra, he assisted Dmitri Sychev in scoring the winning goal, resulting in the team qualifying for the tournament proper. He was called up to Russia's squad for Euro 2008 and played in all of Russia's run to the tournament's semi-final. For the FIFA 2010 World Cup qualification he was called up for six of the ten matches and scored twice in the play-off first leg against Slovenia, which Russia won 2–1. His two goals were not enough as Russia lost the second leg 1–0 and Slovenia progressed to the World Cup on the away goals rule.

Personal life
Bilyaletdinov is an ethnic Tatar. His father Rinat Bilyaletdinov was also a professional footballer and is now a coach.

On 11 June 2011, Bilyaletdinov married Maria, a former cheerleader for the basketball club CSKA Moscow. Their first son, Timur, was born on 21 March 2012.

It was reported on 28 September 2022, that Diniyar Bilyaletdinov has been drafted into the Russian army following the partial mobilization announcement made by President Putin. Diniyar clarified on the next day that he won't be called up at this time, after his military registration data was brought up-to-date during a visit to the military commissariat.

Career statistics

Club

International

Scores and results list Russia's goal tally first, score column indicates score after each Bilyaletdinov goal.

Honours

Club
Lokomotiv Moscow
 Russian Premier League: 2004
 Russian Cup: 2006–07
 Russian Super Cup: 2005
 CIS Cup: 2005

International
Russia
 UEFA European Championship bronze medalist: 2008

Individual
Everton Goal of the Season: 2009–10 vs. Manchester United

References

External links

 EvertonFC.com profile
 fclm.ru Lokomotiv Moscow Player profile
 Premier League profile 
 Bilyaletdinov's Instagram account
 
 

1985 births
Living people
FC Lokomotiv Moscow players
Everton F.C. players
FC Spartak Moscow players
FC Anzhi Makhachkala players
FC Torpedo Moscow players
FC Rubin Kazan players
FK Riteriai players
Association football midfielders
Russia under-21 international footballers
Russia international footballers
Russian footballers
Russian Premier League players
Premier League players
UEFA Euro 2008 players
Russian expatriate footballers
Expatriate footballers in England
Russian expatriate sportspeople in England
Expatriate footballers in Lithuania
Footballers from Moscow
Tatar people of Russia
Tatar sportspeople
A Lyga players
Moscow State University of Economics, Statistics, and Informatics alumni